is a light gun shooter game developed and published by Nintendo. Originally created as an electro-mechanical arcade game in 1974 by Gunpei Yokoi, it was adapted to a video game format for the Famicom console in 1984. It was released in 1985 as a launch game for the Nintendo Entertainment System (NES) with the Zapper light gun.

Original version
The original version of Wild Gunman is one of Nintendo's electro-mechanical (EM) arcade games created by Gunpei Yokoi and released in 1974. It consists of a light gun connected to a 16 mm projection screen. Full-motion video footage of an American Wild West gunslinger is projected onto the screen. When this enemy character's eyes flash, the player draws and fires the gun. If the player is fast enough, the projection changes to that of the shot gunman falling down; otherwise it shows the gunman drawing and firing his gun. 

Regardless of their success, the player continues to face off against other gunslinger opponents, of which there are five in total. 

Should the player draw their gun prematurely, a 'foul' light turns on and the player's input is ignored for the rest of the duel, rendering it unwinnable. 

This version of Wild Gunman was released in North America by Sega in 1976. The game's footage was filmed with local, uncredited extras on location at the Nara Dreamland amusement park

The second version has a plastic gunman figure mounted on top of a plastic battery box called Custom Gunman, which later became one of the microgames in the Game Boy Advance title WarioWare, Inc.: Mega Microgames!.

In Japan, Wild Gunman was the sixth highest-grossing EM arcade game of 1976, below two other Nintendo Laser Clay Shooting System titles, Sky Hawk at fourth place and Mini Laser Clay at fifth. In North America, Wild Gunman was one of the most popular arcade machines at the AMOA 1976 show.

The game consists of four film scenes, called Film-A, Film-B, Film-C and Film-D. Each scene was shot on two 16 mm film reels, for displaying alternate outcomes, making up a total of eight film reels. Two of the original reels were discovered by collector Benjamin Solovey in 2021.

Video game version

Nintendo converted the electro-mechanical concept into a video game, replacing filmed footage with cartoon-style sprites.

In 1984 in Japan, the Famicom version was released for use with the original version of the Zapper gun peripheral. This version, named the Beam Gun, was a plastic, western-style revolver accessory (modeled after the Colt Single Action Army) that came packaged with a plastic holster belt. In 1985 in the United States, it was released on the Nintendo Entertainment System.

In the NES version, the player waits for the opponent's eyes to flash (accompanied by a speech bubble reading "FIRE!!") before shooting. It features a shooting gallery where opponents are to be shot from the windows of a saloon. A piece of Frédéric Chopin's "Funeral march" indicates the player's defeat. This version was also published on the PlayChoice-10 arcade system. On the Wii U Virtual Console, the Wii Remote pointer is used instead of the Zapper.

Popular culture

Experimental filmmaker Craig Baldwin's 1978 short Wild Gunman features footage from the original 1974 arcade game which was re-edited, sped up, and slowed down to surreal effect.

The original 1974 arcade game also appears in the 1981 film Gas, being played by the main antagonist. The film establishes the antagonist's ruthless cowboy-like personality by juxtaposing directly captured clips of the game with footage of him giving an expository monologue to his sons (and the audience) while playing. After delivering the monologue, he loses to a gunman and proceeds to shoot the game's projector screen multiple times with a real gun. The game's appearance is also a nod to the character's actor, frequent western star Sterling Hayden

In the 1989 film Back to the Future Part II, protagonist Marty McFly plays a non-existent arcade version of the NES Wild Gunman resembling a Nintendo VS. System cabinet. The 1990 follow-up, Part III, reveals that frequently playing the game has given Marty the skill to shoot a real revolver. Nintendo re-released the game to the Wii U Virtual Console on October 21, 2015, to coincide with Back to the Future Day, honoring the game's appearance in the film.

In the Super Smash Bros. series, the Duck Hunt duo can summon Wild Gunman characters to attack their opponents. Their "Final Smash" attack causes opponents to get caught in the middle of a shootout between the gunmen and the enemy characters from Hogan's Alley.

See also
Duck Hunt
Hogan's Alley
Gumshoe
Laser Clay Shooting System

Notes

References

External links
Wild Gunman series at NinDB
Wild Gunman Arcade Prop Replica at KLOV
Front and Back side of the flyer of the original 1974 Wild Gunman movie game (from  Arcade Flyer Archive) as well as two pictures #1  and  #2 of this version (from an AOL member homepage).

1984 video games
Arcade video games
Full motion video based games 
Intelligent Systems games
Light gun games
PlayChoice-10 games
Nintendo arcade games
Nintendo Entertainment System games
Nintendo games
Western (genre) video games
Video games developed in Japan
Video games directed by Shigeru Miyamoto
Virtual Console games
Virtual Console games for Wii U
Light guns